Dassault Systèmes SE (abbreviated 3DS) is a French multinational software corporation which develops software for 3D product design, simulation, manufacturing and other 3D related products.

Founded in 1981, it is headquartered in Vélizy-Villacoublay, France, and has around 20,000 employees in 140 countries.

History

1980s 
Dassault Systèmes (also known as 3DS) grew out of the aerospace industry’s search for more sophisticated drafting tools to streamline the development process and aid in the increasing complexity of aviation design. Dassault Systèmes spun out in 1981 (as part of Dassault Group) to develop and market their 3D surface design software CATI, later renamed CATIA. That same year, 3DS signed a sales and marketing agreement with IBM, allowing IBM to resell the CATIA CAD software.

1990s 
In the 1990s, 3DS’ software was used to develop seven out of every ten new airplanes and four out of every ten new cars worldwide. Major players in the aviation and automotive industries, including Honda, Mercedes-Benz, BMW and Boeing, were able to design and mock-up their products in CATIA rather than using CAD programs and physical prototypes. The Boeing 777, the Falcon 2000 business jet, and the Rafale jet fighter were designed using CATIA.

In 1997, following success in launching their initial public offering (IPO), the company acquired SolidWorks and Deneb Robotics, which later became part of the DELMIA brand, and additional software to build toward product lifecycle management (PLM). The SolidWorks acquisition strengthened 3DS’ 2D drafting capacity and provided entry into the Microsoft market, while other acquisitions added digital manufacturing software to the product lineup. These acquisitions paved the way for 3DS to introduce a total manufacturing system with their subsidiary brand, DELMIA, in 1998. The new offering enabled the access of data across the spectrum of manufacturing processes, while remaining independent of the CAD environment.

By the end of 1998, the CAD software industry vendors were devising strategies to become internet-enabled. The main focus was to enable viewing of 3D models in web browsers and building interfaces to product data management (PDM) systems. 3DS was one of the leaders in enabling these functions for their users. The company benefited from their experience integrating CAD software across networks for the Boeing 777 project, and had already made moves toward internet-enabled CAD software in 1996 with CATIA Conferencing Groupware; which enabled review and annotation of models using the internet. The introduction of ENOVIA further marked their industry-leading place by providing internet-enabled PDM and 3D product lifecycle management. 3DS’ acquisitions continued into 1999, when two CAD software vendors were purchased: Matra Datavision and Smart Solutions. Also in 1999, 3DS released CATIA Version 5, which was the first version to be fully implemented in the Microsoft Windows environment.

2000-2009 
As the demand for digital and virtual experiences increased in 2000, 3DS launched DELMIA, which provides digital manufacturing tools to drive innovation and efficiency through virtual planning, simulating, and modeling of production processes.

The mid-2000s heralded a series of acquisitions for 3DS to improve their product offerings and expand their market reach, and 3DS launched new software and tools. In 2005, 3DS sought to improve the quality of 3D interactions and simulations. First they acquired Abaqus, a US-based company specializing in software that allows engineers to simulate and observe the performance of components in products.

Then they acquired Virtools, a comprehensive software solution that enables companies to give life to 3D by creating applications with rich game-like 3D interactivity. The following year, the company extended its market reach into high-tech, consumer products, and medical devices through the acquisition of MatrixOne, which would be linked with ENOVIA. In 2007, subsidiary brand 3DVIA was launched to create a social network and content community for 3D artists and modelers.

CATIA under the 3DEXPERIENCE platform enables users to go beyond physical product definition to model any product in the context of its real-life behavior. Systems, architects, engineers, designers and all contributors collaborate on fit, form, function, and customer experience.

2010–present 
As the 2000s progressed, Dassault Systèmes began to enter online applications and build toward more online applications for product data management, collaboration, realistic simulation and more. Examples of this strategy include the purchase or launch of brands such as EXALEAD for information intelligence, NETVIBES for business analytics, 3DEXCITE for marketing, and GEOVIA for modeling the planet. In 2012, the company launched the 3DEXPERIENCE platform to connect its software applications and enable global interoperability and cross-functional collaboration. Dassault Systèmes also began to offer its version of digital twins, which the company calls virtual twin experiences and are powered by the 3DEXPERIENCE platform. Virtual twins help companies visualize, model and simulate an entire environment to explore how a product or process will behave when assembled, operated or subjected to a range of events.
To expand their capabilities and industries served through the 3DEXPERIENCE platform, 3DS completed additional acquisitions, including:

 Simpoe S.A.S. (2013)
 Realtime Technology (2014)
 Accelrys (2014)
 Quintiq (2014)
 CST (2016)
 Outscale (majority stake, 2016)
 Centric (majority stake, 2018)
 IQMS (2018)
 Medidata Solutions (2019)
 NuoDB (2020)
 Proxem (2020)
 Diota (2022)

Throughout the decade, 3DS advanced into the life sciences and healthcare industry, including launching the Living Heart Project for simulating heart function in 2014 and acquiring subsidiary brand MEDIDATA for managing clinical trials, in 2019.

In late 2022, Dassault Systèmes, along with French companies Docaposte, Bouygues Telecom and Banque des Territoires, announced plans to create Numspot, a joint effort to build a European sovereign cloud service for the financial, health and public sectors that would rely on the infrastructure of 3DS Outscale.

In 2022, the company named Philippine de T’Serclaes as its chief sustainability officer.

In 2023, Dassault Systèmes was listed by the Special Advisory Council for Myanmar as being among the companies that had assisted the weapons production of Myanmar's military junta and could be at risk of being complicit in its violation of human rights.

Products and brands 
Before 2000, the company focused on 3D design software with CATIA and SolidWorks. Over the next decade, new brands were launched: ENOVIA for product data management and collaboration, DELMIA for manufacturing and global operations, and SIMULIA for realistic simulation.

The company later added EXALEAD (for information intelligence and search), NETVIBES (for business analytics), 3DEXCITE (for marketing), GEOVIA (for modeling the planet), BIOVIA (for modeling the biosphere), MEDIDATA (for managing clinical trials) and OUTSCALE (for strategic,
sovereign cloud).

People and culture 
3DS has 20,000 employees across 140 countries: 39% are based in Europe; 30% in Asia-Oceania; and 31% in the Americas. Geographic headquarters are located in Paris (Vélizy-Villacoublay, France), Tokyo, Japan and Boston (Waltham, Massachusetts). As of December 31, 2019, approximately 39% of employees worked in R&D.

In recent years, 3DS has been named Forbes’ World’s Most Innovative Companies, Corporate Knights’ World's Most Sustainable Corporations, Forbes' World's Best Employers and Fortune’s Future 50 companies with the strongest long-term growth potential.

Corporate information

Holdings 
The list below sets forth the company's main subsidiaries and also indicates the percentage equity interest and voting rights directly or indirectly held by Dassault Systèmes SA.

 Dassault Data Services SAS (France) – 95%
 Dassault Systèmes Americas Corp. (US) – 100%
 Dassault Systèmes Services LLC (US) – 100%
 Dassault Systèmes Deutschland GmbH (Germany) – 100%
 Dassault Systèmes SolidWorks Corp. (US) – 100%
 Dassault Systèmes K.K. (Japan) – 100%
 Dassault Systèmes Enovia Corp. (US) – 100%
 SolidWorks Japan K.K. (Japan) – 100%
 Dassault Systèmes Delmia Corp. (US) – 100%
 Dassault Systèmes Korea Corp. (Korea) – 100%
 Dassault Systèmes Simulia Corp. (US) – 100%

Company management 
 Chairman of the Board of Directors: Charles Edelstenne
 Vice Chairman & Chief Executive Officer: Bernard Charlès
 Chief Operating Officer: Pascal Daloz
 Chief Financial Officer: Rouven Bergmann
 President, Research & Development: Dominique Florack
 General Secretary: Thibault de Tersant
 Chief People and Information Officer: Laurence Barthès
 Industry Solutions, Field Marketing, Global Affairs: Florence Verzelen
 Research & Development: Florence Hu‑Aubigny
 3DS Global Brands: Philippe Laufer
 Europe, Middle East, Africa, Russia: Olivier Ribet
 Asia-Pacific: Samson Khaou
 North America Managing Director: Erik Swedberg
 Business Platform Experience: Elisa Prisner
 Corporate Equity & Communications: Victoire de Margerie
 Chief Sustainability Officer: Philippine de T’Serclaes

Market data 
The shareholders as listed in the annual financial report for 2019:
 Public – 49.64%
 GIMD (Groupe Industriel Marcel Dassault) – 40.50%
 Charles Edelstenne – 5.99%
 Bernard Charlès – 1.5%
 Treasury stock and indirect treasury stock – 1.73%
 Directors and senior management – 0.63%.

References

External links

Companies based in Paris-Saclay
Companies listed on Euronext Paris
CAC 40
Software companies of France
Dassault Group
French companies established in 1981